Autoroute 40, officially known as Autoroute Félix-Leclerc outside Montreal  and Metropolitan Autoroute/Autoroute Métropolitaine within Montreal, is an Autoroute on the north shore of the St. Lawrence River in the Canadian province of Quebec. It is one of the two major connections between Montreal and Quebec City, the other being Autoroute 20 on the south shore of the St. Lawrence. Between the Ontario–Quebec boundary and the interchange with Autoroute 25, the route is signed as part of the Trans-Canada Highway.

Route description 
The western terminus of Autoroute 40 is located at the Ontario–Quebec border, where it continues as Highway 417 towards Ottawa; the eastern terminus is in Boischatel, where it transitions into Route 138 at the end of the freeway.

The portion of Autoroute 40 from the Ontario border to Autoroute 25 is part of the Trans-Canada Highway. The Metropolitan Autoroute portion in Montreal is the busiest highway in Quebec, the busiest section of the Trans-Canada Highway, as well as the second busiest highway section overall in Canada after Highway 401 in Toronto.

History 
Two sections of Autoroute 40 were not part of the original plans: The original intention was to bypass Trois-Rivières to the north (the existing A-40 through downtown would have been Autoroute 755 and the concurrency with Autoroute 55 would have been simply A-55). In addition, a different route was originally planned around Quebec City south of Jean Lesage International Airport (the existing  segment of Autoroute 40 between Saint-Augustin-de-Desmaures and Autoroute 73 would have been the western end of Autoroute 440, thus explaining the exit numbering starting at 12). While the right-of-ways of both bypasses still exist and may still be developed in the future as congestion increases, there are no immediate plans to renew construction.

A  stretch of the highway in Pointe-Claire, from roughly St. John's Boulevard, near Fairview Pointe-Claire Shopping Centre, to the turnaround loop, Senneville Road was used during the 1976 Summer Olympics for the men's road team time trial cycling race.

In 1997, the highway (apart from the portion served by the Metropolitan Autoroute) was renamed Autoroute Félix-Leclerc after the late Quebec artist and political activist Félix Leclerc.

Prior to 1997, Autoroute 40 east of Montreal had four different names, the first section was named Autoroute de la Rive-Nord (North Shore Autoroute) between Montréal and Saint-Augustin-de-Desmaures (km 87 to 196, 209 to 296). A segment in Trois-Rivières east of Autoroute 55 that was named Autoroute de Francheville (Francheville Autoroute) (km 196 to 207). Between Saint-Augustin-de-Desmaures and Autoroute 73 in Quebec City (km 296 to 307) it was called Autoroute Charest. Finally, between the junction of Autoroute 73 and Autoroute 573 and its eastern end at Route 138 it was known as Autoroute de la Capitale, a name that is still commonly used by Quebec City residents.

Exit list

See also 

 List of crossings of the Ottawa River
 List of bridges in Montreal

References

External links

 Metropolitan Expressway (Autoroute Metropolitaine) at Steve Anderson's MontrealRoads.com
 A-40 at motorways-exits.com 
 A-40 at Quebec Autoroutes
 Virtual tour of A-40
Transports Quebec Map  

Venues of the 1976 Summer Olympics
40
Quebec 040
Transport in Repentigny, Quebec
Roads in Montreal
Streets in Quebec City
Transport in Terrebonne, Quebec
Transport in Dorval
Transport in Pointe-Claire
Transport in Trois-Rivières
Former toll roads in Canada